The Astana Dakar Team are the rally raid team, competes in the multiple rally raid races and in the Dakar Rally. The team participated in cars and trucks classes. They were founded in 2011 to develop  the brand Astana, as the part of the Astana Presidential Club.

References

External links

Social media
 

2011 establishments in Kazakhstan
Astana Presidential Club
Dakar rally racing teams